Driver drowsiness detection is a car safety technology which helps prevent accidents caused by the driver getting drowsy. Various studies have suggested that around 20% of all road accidents are fatigue-related, up to 50% on certain roads.

Some of the current systems learn driver patterns and can detect when a driver is becoming drowsy.

Technology
Various technologies can be used to try to detect driver drowsiness.

Steering pattern monitoring
Primarily uses steering input from electric power steering system. Monitoring a driver this way only works as long as a driver actually steers a vehicle actively instead of using an automatic lane-keeping system.

Vehicle position in lane monitoring
Uses a lane monitoring camera. Monitoring a driver this way only works as long as a driver actually steers a vehicle actively instead of using an automatic lane-keeping system.

Driver eye/face monitoring
Uses computer vision to observe the driver's face, either using a built-in camera or on mobile devices.

Physiological measurement
Requires body sensors to measure parameters like brain activity, heart rate, skin conductance, muscle activity, head movements etc...

Systems
Audi: Rest recommendation system
BMW: Active Driving Assistant with Attention Assistant analyses driving behaviour and, if necessary, advises the driver to rest. The advice to take a break is provided in the form of graphic symbols shown on the Control Display.
Bosch: "Driver drowsiness detection"  takes input from the steering angle sensor, front-mounted lane assist camera, vehicle speed and turn signal stalk.
Citroën: AFIL/LDWS uses different technologies to monitor the vehicle position on the road. Some models use sensors mounted in front of the front wheels, monitoring the lane markings. Other models use a camera mounted in top center of the windscreen for the same purpose. Both systems alert the driver by vibrations in the driver's seat, on the left or right half of the seat cushion, respectively. Introduced with the 2005 model C4, later followed by 2008 C5 and 2013 C4 Picasso.
DS: 
AFIL/LDWS: Lane Departure Warning System gives an audible reminder if you drift out of your lane.
DS DRIVER ATTENTION MONITORING identifies any reduction in driver alertness. Using an infrared camera above the steering wheel, DS DRIVER ATTENTION MONITORING continuously monitors: the eyes for signs of tiredness (blinking); the face and head movements for signs of distraction; and the course steered by the car in its road lane (deviations or steering movements by the driver).
Ford: Driver Alert, introduced with 2011 Ford Focus.
Honda: CRV introduced the Driver Attention Monitor in 2017.  It is also offered on the 2018 Accord
Hyundai: Driver Attention Alert (DAA), debuted with the 2017 i30.
Jaguar Land Rover: Driver Condition Monitor and Driver Fatigue Alert, both evaluate driving technique for signs of driver fatigue. When the feature determines if the driver is fatigued, the message center displays the warning, TAKE A BREAK!, for 1 minute, accompanied by an audible chime. When driving continues for more than 15 minutes after the first warning, without taking a break, a further warning is given. The warning continues until the OK button on the steering wheel menu control is pressed.
Kia: Driver Attention Warning (DAW), debuted with the 2018 Stinger.
Mazda: Driver Attention Alert  Activates at speeds above . Learns driving behavior through steering input and position of road during the beginning of the ride and compares the learned data during later stages of the ride. A difference above a certain threshold triggers an audible and visual cue. Debuted on 2015 Mazda CX-5.
Mercedes-Benz: Attention Assist In 2009, Mercedes-Benz unveiled a system called Attention Assist which monitors the driver's fatigue level and drowsiness based on his/her driving inputs.  It issues a visual and audible alarm to alert the driver if he or she is too drowsy to continue driving. It is linked to the car's navigation system, and using that data, it can tell the driver where coffee and fuel are available.
Cadillac: GM 2018 Cadillac CT6 Super Cruise System, The Cadillac Super Cruise system uses FOVIO vision technology, developed by Seeing Machines , to enable a gumdrop-sized infrared camera on the steering wheel column to accurately determine the driver's attention state.  This is accomplished through a precise measure of head orientation and eyelid movements under a full range of daytime and night-time driving conditions including the use of sunglasses.
Nissan: Driver Attention Alert (DAA), debuted with the 2014 Qashqai, followed by 2016 Maxima.
Renault/Dacia: Tiredness Detection Warning (TDW), introduced with 2016 Megane.
Subaru: EyeSight Driver Assist
Škoda: iBuzz Fatigue Alert (available on most models since 2013 onwards)
Volkswagen: Fatigue detection system
Volvo Cars: Driver Alert Control In 2007, Volvo Cars launched the world's first Driver Drowsiness Detection system, Driver Alert Control. The system monitors the car's movements and assesses whether the vehicle is being driven in a controlled or uncontrolled way. If the system detects a high risk of the driver being drowsy, the driver is alerted via an audible signal. Also, a text message appears in the car's information display, alerting him or her with a coffee cup symbol to take a break. Additionally, the driver can continuously retrieve driving information from the car's trip computer. The starting-point is five bars. The less consistent the driving, the fewer bars remain. 
 Anti Sleep Pilot - Danish device that can be fitted to any vehicle, uses a combination of accelerometers and reaction tests.
 Vigo - Smart Bluetooth headset that detects signs of drowsiness through the eyes and head motion, and uses a combination of light, sound, and vibration to alert the user.
 COREforTech -  Measuring physiological signs of drowsiness allows CORE for Tech ™ to get very early signs of fatigue and act accordingly

Regulation

In European Union, regulation (EU) 2019/2144 regulates the driver monitoring system.

See also 
Driver Monitoring System (Toyota)
Fatigue detection software

References

Advanced driver assistance systems
Applications of computer vision